Boudoir photography is a photographic style featuring intimate, sensual, romantic, and sometimes erotic images of its subjects in a photographic studio, bedroom or private dressing room environment, primarily intended for the private enjoyment of the subjects and their romantic partners. It is distinct from glamour and art nude photography in that it is usually more suggestive rather than explicit in its approach to nudity and sexuality, features subjects who do not regularly model, and produces images that are not intended to be seen by a wide audience, but rather to remain under the control of the subject.

Common motivations for boudoir photography shoots include a surprise gift by a bride to their future husbands on or before their wedding day, undertaking weight loss regimes or other forms of body alteration (such as breast augmentation or cancer surgery), and as a gift to servicepersons overseas.

History 

The term "boudoir" comes from the French Language verb bouder meaning "to sulk" and was primarily attributed to women's dressing rooms or sitting rooms and private salons.  Nude or sexualized female forms have been a theme of photography since as early as 1840. Early erotic photography, such as French postcards from the late 19th and early 20th century, pin-up girls, and Hollywood culture have influenced the visual style of boudoir photography. Notable early artists of the form include Albert Arthur Allen, who photographed larger women against ornate backgrounds.

Boudoir during WWII 
After the dissolution of the Prohibition Era in 1933 and the beginning of World War II, the US Government began using propaganda to encourage young men to fight for their country. With the knowledge that “sex sells”, the military began using pin-up girls on their recruiting posters with slogans like “She’s worth fighting for” or “Come home to your girl a hero”. This made the pin-up girl one of the most recognizable forms of boudoir and paved the way for modern boudoir by normalizing the female form in advertising.

Known for her “million dollar legs”, actress Betty Grable was the icon of pin-up girls in the 1930s and '40s. One of her most famous portraits was distributed to over five million troops during WWII. Not only was she known as one of the first women to take out insurance on a body part, she was also known for being one of the highest paid female actors in Hollywood during her time. Other examples of boudoir from that era include images of Clara Bow, Mae West and Jean Harlow.

Boudoir in the 21st Century 
Boudoir photography was popularised in the millennium with the arrival of digital photography.  It became popular with women seeking to create a private collection of professional studio portraits. Boudoir photography dates from the mid-1980s onwards, and is characterized by the empowerment of its female subjects, who now are typically the photographer's direct clients rather than being hired models.

Appeal 

It is common for women to have boudoir photographs of themselves made as a gift to a partner, conventionally on the occasion of their engagement, marriage, or before an enforced separation such as a military deployment. In the United Kingdom it became popular for brides-to-be to commission photoshoots as a wedding gift for the groom. Boudoir photography is also sometimes given as a gift with the intention of re-affirming and encouraging the romance and sensuality between partners in a long-term relationship.

Increasingly, boudoir photography is seen as something that a person might do purely for their own enjoyment, for the pleasure and affirmation of seeing themselves as attractive, daring, sensual, and sexually desirable.

Styles 

Boudoir photography encompasses a range of styles and moods. Named categories of boudoir photography include so-called "naughty girl", "fun and giggles", and "provocative and sensual", with varying degrees of explicitness and nudity.

Shibari style boudoir photography 

Visually the genre is characterized by diffuse high-key images that flatter the appearance of skin, short focal distances, and shallow depth of field, which together impart an intimate, "dreamy" mood. Other common styles include a low-key, deliberately grainy black-and-white, reflecting the influence of art nudes, early erotic photography, and film noir. Also common are poses and lighting setups intended to replicate the mood and appearance of classic pin-up photographs and paintings.

See also 

 Boudoir
 Erotic photography
 Pin-up girl

References 

Erotic photography